Resurrection Remix OS, abbreviated as RR, is a free and open-source operating system for smartphones and tablet computers, based on the Android mobile platform. UX designer and head developer Altan KRK & Varun Date started the project in 2012.

History 
On February 9, 2018, Resurrection Remix 6.0.0 was released, based on Android 8.1 Oreo after months in development. In early 2019 Resurrection Remix 7.0.0, 7.0.1 and 7.0.2 were released, based on Android 9 Pie. The project seemed abandoned after a disagreement between 2 major developers which caused one of them (Acar) to leave, but later in mid 2020, Resurrection Remix came back with 8.5.7 based on Android 10. 8.7.3 is the latest version based on Android 10.

Reviews and studies 
A DroidViews review of Resurrection Remix OS called it "feature packed," and complimented the large online community, updates, and customization options, as compared with the simplicity of Lineage OS. ZDNet stated Resurrection Remix OS was a custom ROM that could evade SafetyNet exclusions and display Netflix app in Play Store.

Resurrection Remix OS was one of a few operating systems mentioned as Android upgrade options in Upcycled Technology. Resurrection Remix OS was one of a handful of operating systems supported by the OpenKirin development team for bringing pure Android to Huawei devices, and was one of two suggested for OnePlus 5.

In a 2017 detailed review, Stefanie Enge of Curved.De said Resurrection Remix combined the best of LineageOS, OmniROM and SlimRoms. The camera performance was criticized, however, extensive customization options, speed and lack of Google services were all acclaimed.

In a study of phone sensors, Resurrection Remix OS was one of six Android Operating Systems used on two Xiaomi devices, to compare gyroscope, accelerometer, orientation and light sensor data to values recorded by very accurate, reference sensors.

Supported devices 
More than 150 devices are supported, some of which are:

See also

 List of custom Android firmware

References

External links
 

Custom Android firmware
Linux distributions